The Fulton Reception and Diagnostic Center is a state minimum-security diagnostic prison for men located in Fulton, Callaway County, Missouri, USA, owned and operated by the Missouri Department of Corrections.

References

Prisons in Missouri
Buildings and structures in Callaway County, Missouri
1986 establishments in Missouri